Alan Hanks (born April 4, 1960) is an American politician. He served on the Rapid City Council from 1996 to 2004, in the South Dakota House of Representatives from 2004 to 2007, and as mayor of Rapid City from 2007 to 2011.

Background
Hanks was born in 1960 to parents Ethan and Fae Hanks. The three, along with Hanks' two siblings, moved to Rapid City, South Dakota when Hanks was 9 years old. There, Hanks' parents taught in the city school system. Hanks attended Stevens High School, where he was involved in football, basketball, and track. He graduated in 1979. In 1983, he received a degree in business administration from the University of South Dakota.

Following college, Hanks returned to Rapid City to manage a large furniture store, and in 1987, he opened 2 of his own stores in both Rapid City and Sioux Falls.
In 2001, after owning his stores for almost 20 years, Hanks built the Heartland RV Park and Cabins on Highway 79 (which he continues to operate). In 2005, Hanks began work as a licensed real estate appraiser and owns and manages Hanks Appraisal Services.

It was not until 1996 that Hanks ventured into politics. He began as an appointed member of the Rapid City planning commission, and in 1998 was elected to the City Council as Ward 1 Alderman. He served on several subcommittees and was elected as President of the City Council. In 2004, Hanks was elected to the South Dakota State Legislature as a state representative from District 32. After three years in this position, Hanks defeated Jim Shaw for the office of Mayor of Rapid City, SD serving two terms. In 2008, he received the Rapid City Elks Club's Distinguished Citizenship Award.

Personal
Hanks has one daughter, Breanna.

References

External links

Mayors of Rapid City, South Dakota
Living people
1960 births
South Dakota city council members
Members of the South Dakota House of Representatives
University of South Dakota alumni
20th-century American politicians
21st-century American politicians